Philotheos Kokkinos (Thessaloniki, c. 1300 – Constantinople, 1379) was the Ecumenical Patriarch of Constantinople for two periods from November 1353 to 1354 and 1364 to 1376, and a leader of the Byzantine monastic and religious revival in the 14th century. His numerous theological, liturgical, and canonical works received wide circulation not only in Byzantium but throughout the Slavic Orthodox world. 

He was appointed patriarch in 1353 by the emperor John VI Kantakouzenos, deposed by John V Palaiologos in 1354, then restored to the patriarchal throne in 1364. He opposed Emperor John V in his intent to negotiate the political re-union of the churches with Popes Urban V and Gregory XI. Instead, in 1367 he supported the proposed assembly of an authentic, ecumenical union-council, in order to properly resolve the differences with the Western Church.

He is commemorated on October 11, and is regarded as a "Protector of Orthodoxy", alongside Saints Photios the Great, Mark Evgenikos, and Gregory Palamas.

Early life

Philotheus' early life is not known. He was a native of Thessalonika and is believed to have been born about the year 1300. His mother was a Jewish convert to Orthodox Christianity.

He was taught by the magistros Thomas (d. 1347), one of the most learned men of the time, and showed great talent for theological as well as secular studies.

Early career

Philotheus entered the monastic life early, first becoming a monk at Mount Sinai, then later at Mount Athos. 

At Mount Athos, he lived his monastic life first at Vatopaidi Monastery, where he formed a relationship with St. Savvas the Fool-For-Christ (d. 1350), for whom he became a biographer. Later he went on to the Great Lavra Monastery, where he formed a relationship with St. Gregory Palamas, for whom he became a biographer as well. 

He was a supporter of St. Gregory Palamas and became a follower and advocate of the form of contemplative prayer called Hesychasm, and the Orthodox theology of uncreated Grace. As a writer of note, Philotheus wrote works on the theology of the Uncreated Energies of God and refuted the scholastic philosophy that was then current in the Western church. His most famous work, written in 1339, was the Hagiorite Tome, the manifesto of the Athonite monks on how the saints partake of the Divine and uncreated Light that the Apostles beheld at the Transfiguration of Jesus.

In 1340 he was appointed abbot of the Monastery of Philokalou in Thessalonica, but was soon recalled to Mount Athos in 1344 to direct the Great Lavra as the Hegumen. 

In recognition of his contribution in the Hesychast controversy, Patriarch Isidore appointed him Metropolitan of Heraclea in Thrace in 1347. However becoming a protégé of co-Emperor John VI Kantakouzenos, Bishop Philotheus spent most of his time in Constantinople. During his absence, the city of Heraclea fell prey to the rivalry of the Genoese and the Venetians. In 1351 the Genoese led by Paganino Doria sacked his episcopal see of Heraclea. It was only due to the intervention of Bishop Philotheus that a large number of the inhabitants which were imprisoned by the Genoese, were set free. Thereafter he preserved a firm personal antagonism against the Genoese for the rest of his life. 

In 1351, he took part in the "Hesychast Council" in Constantinople, and wrote its Acts.

First patriarchate

In 1353, Philotheus, renowned for his learning and his Orthodoxy, was appointed Patriarch of Constantinople by John VI Kantakouzenos.

In 1354, after John V Palaiologos obtained the abdication of John VI Kantakouzenos and forced him into a monastery under the name Joseph Christodoulus, he forced also the deposition of Patriarch Philotheus, who resumed the see of Heraclea.

Second patriarchate

In 1364 Philotheus was recalled to the patriarchal throne in Constantinople on the death of Callistus I.

Relations with Rome

Since 1354 the Ottoman Empire had gained a foothold in Europe at Gallipoli, threatening Constantinople from a new side. By 1362 Adrianople fell to the Ottomans and served as the forward base for Ottoman expansion into Europe. Threatened anew, John V Palaiologos appealed to the West for help in defending Constantinople against the Turks, proposing, in return, to end the East–West Schism between Constantinople and Rome. In October 1369 John, having travelled through Naples to Rome, formally converted to Catholicism in St Peter's Basilica and recognized the pope as supreme head of the Church. Opposed to re-union on political terms, Philotheus opposed these efforts by John V to negotiate with Popes Urban V (1362-70) and Gregory XI (1370-78).

On the other hand Philotheus' second period as Patriarch was notable for his efforts to open sincere discussions with the Roman Church to end the Schism — not by diplomatic efforts like those of Emperor John V, who had just abjured Orthodoxy for the Latin faith — but out of a real desire for a true and authentic union. To this end, in 1367 he was in favour of holding an ecumenical union-council to resolve the differences with the Western Church, however the discussions came to nothing as the idea was rejected by Pope Urban VI in 1369. This unfortunate end signalled to Philotheos the suspension of any further efforts to approach the West.

Synod in 1368

The authority of the Acts of the "Hesychast Council" of 1351 were confirmed in the synod of 1368. In addition, Philotheus led the synodal decision to proclaim Gregory Palamas a Saint, ordaining the Second Sunday of Great Lent to be his feast and composing the Church's services to St Gregory Palamas. 

A notable example of the campaign to enforce the Orthodoxy of the Palamist doctrine was the condemnation of Demetrios and Prochorus Cydones at this synod. Applying Aristotelian logic to the Neoplatonic character of Hesychasm, the Kydones brothers had accused Palamas of Pantheism or Polytheism. In the end, Prochorus was excommunicated and deposed from the clergy in perpetuity.

Relations with the Slavic Orthodox world

Philotheus also nourished a strong commitment to the unity of the Orthodox world in his second tenure, pursuing an ecclesiastical policy to organize the Orthodox churches of the Serbians, Russians, and Bulgarians, unto which hesychastic theology and spirituality spread. 

About 1354 Saint Sergius of Radonezh, the founder of the Trinity monastery, was visited by envoys from Patriarch Philotheus, urging him to introduce a community rule into his monastery, as the Byzantines placed increased value on Cenobitic monasticism in this period. After some hesitation, Saint Sergius complied with this request, and the Trinity monastery, by adopting the Studite Constitution, became the model for all other late medieval Russian koinobia. Secondly, the monastery's close links with Constantinople facilitated the spread of Hesychasm to Central and Northern Russia.

Since one of the obstacles to a united Orthodox front was the schism — since 1350 — which separated the Patriarchate of Constantinople and the Serbian Patriarchate of Peć, Philotheos recognized the latter in 1375 and restored unity. The act of excommunication of was revoked and the Serbian Church was recognized as a Patriarchate, under the condition of returning all eparchies in contested southern regions to the jurisdiction of the Patriarchate of Constantinople.

In 1375 Patriarch Philotheus consecrated Cyprian as 'Metropolitan of Kiev, Lithuania, and Russia' in the lifetime of Alexius, the lawful incumbent of two of these three sees. The Russians felt deeply humiliated by this affront to their popular metropolitan, and the confusion ended only in 1390, when the Muscovites accepted Cyprian as Metropolitan of Russia.

Writer and hymnographer

Philotheus was also engaged in writing a number of works setting forth the theology of the uncreated Energies and successfully taking issue with the humanist theologians who, in the works of Western scholastics, especially Thomas Aquinas, found a naturalistic philosophy that enabled them to express their love of classical Antiquity to the full. In addition, he also composed admirable lives of Saints. As a hymn writer, Philotheus is known for composing a service in commemoration of the Fathers of the Fourth Ecumenical Council in Chalcedon, as well composing the services to Saint Gregory Palamas.

Along with Callistus I, Philotheus was a Hesychast Patriarch of Constantinople, who used the lives of saints to extol the ideal of hesychia.

Exile and death

In 1376, Patriarch Philotheus was deposed by Emperor Andronikos IV Palaiologos, when the latter ascended to the imperial throne. 

Philotheus reposed in exile in 1379. His tomb at the Monastery of Akatalyptos Maria Diakonissa (Theotokos Kyriotissa) became a place of many miracles.

Legacy

Robert F. Taft affirms that the liturgical codification of the Eucharistic service of the Great Church reached its full form in the diataxis of Philotheus I of Constantinople.

See also

Palamism
Hesychast controversy

Notes

References

External links
 Our Holy Father Philotheos Kokkinos, Patriarch of Constantinople. Ancient Faith Ministries, Inc. October 11, 2011. (Audio: 2:09 minutes)
 Mihail Mitrea. A Late-Byzantine Hagiographer: Philotheos Kokkinos and His Vitae of Contemporary Saints. PhD in Classics, The University of Edinburgh. 2017.
  Καθηγητού Βασιλείου Δεντάκη (Επιστημονική Επετηρίδα Θεολογικής Σχολής Αθηνών). Βίος και Ακολουθία του Αγίου Φιλοθέου (Κοκκίνου) Πατριάρχου Κωνσταντινουπόλεως (1353-1354 καὶ 1364-1376) τοῦ Θεολόγου. τομ. 17, 1971, σελ. 515-616. (PDF)

Sources
 Venerable Philotheus, Patriarch of Constantinople. OCA - Lives of the Saints.
 Philotheus Kokkinos, Patriarch of Constantinople. Encyclopaedia Britannica.
 St. Philotheus (Kokkinos) of Mt. Athos, patriarch of Constantinople (1379). Holy Trinity Russian Orthodox Church (A parish of the Patriarchate of Moscow).
  Κουρούσης, Σταύρος Ι. "Φιλόθεοϛ. Ό Κόκκινοϛ. Οἰκουμενικόϛ πατριάρχηϛ (1353-1354, 1364-1376)." ΘΗΕ, τόμ. 11, εκδ. Μαρτίνος Αθ., Αθήνα 1967, στ. 1119-1126.

|-

|-

1300 births
1379 deaths
14th-century patriarchs of Constantinople
14th-century Byzantine writers
Byzantine saints of the Eastern Orthodox Church
Byzantine Thessalonians
Byzantine abbots
Byzantine hymnographers
Christian hagiographers
Hesychasts
Liturgists
Scholars in Eastern Orthodoxy
Byzantine exiles
14th-century Greek musicians
14th-century Greek writers
14th-century Greek educators
People associated with Mount Athos
People associated with Vatopedi
People associated with Great Lavra